Christina Stone was a business woman, and was married to Loke Wan Tho, a Singaporean business magnate and later to Jeffrey Stone a film director. Her final marriage was to the Parsi businessman, Dadi Balsara.

Background

Personal
Her father was Lee Chong Miow, the head of Lee and Fletcher Co, Singapore Photo Co. There are some differing versions of her early life. One is that she came from a humble background, later entered a beauty competition and was noticed by her future husband Loke Wan Tho. Hers was that her grandfather was a judge and her father wasn't happy with his childhood and left to become a photographer who went to Borneo, traveled with Verner Brook and then ended up settling in Singapore which was where she was born.

In 1962 she petitioned for divorce from her husband Loke Wan Tho on the grounds of cruelty. He also had do the same. Hers was a counter petition.<ref>Jeffrey Hunter: The Film, Television, Radio and Stage Performances by Paul Green [https://books.google.com/books?id=hK9iAwAAQBAJ&dq=Jeffrey+Hunter+Paul+Green+Strange+Portrait&pg=PA118 Strange POrtrait-Dimension 5 Page 118]</ref> In 1965 she married actor Jeffrey Stone. By 1972 she was divorced from Stone.

Later she married Dr. Dadi Balsara the head of Perfumes Singapore and later the founder and owner of the Himalayan natural mineral water brand. After the Himalayan natural mineral water brand was sold to the TATA group, he lived with Christina at Taj Man Singh Hotel for  37 years, until his death in January 2016.

Professional and public
In 1957 she made a presentation at the Odeon Theatre in Singapore to the winners of a rock'n'roll competition that was in conjunction with the screening of the film Love Me Tender. The Winners of the competition were presented with the Elvis Presley cup and the Platters cup. The competition was to aid a children's fund.  
In 1965 she appeared in the Vogue Magazine as one of Singapores most beautiful woman. In 1966, she became involved in her husband's project, the ill-fated film Strange Portrait''. She had a role in the film playing a ballet dancer. In 1967, she opened Sarong Island which was a tourist isle on a 5-acre island that she owned. Jeffrey Stone said that sarong was an easy word for westerners to remember so that's why they chose the name.

Later she married Dr. Dadi Balsara who at the time was the head of Perfumes Singapore. As a business woman she was chairman of Perfumes Singapore.  in 1977 she and her husband launched the Singapore Girl perfume which did well at department stores and hotels. It was popular with tourists and was sold and on  the planes of Singapore Airlines. It got the Singapore Manufacturers Association's top prize for its design and packing in 1977. The same year Perfumes of Singapore closed down.

References

Socialites
Singaporean socialites
Singaporean women in business
Singaporean photographers
Singaporean women photographers
Singaporean people of Chinese descent
Year of birth missing
Year of death missing